Nuno Borges was the defending champion but chose not to defend his title.

Evgenii Tiurnev won the title after defeating Oleg Prihodko 3–6, 6–4, 6–4 in  the final.

Seeds

Draw

Finals

Top half

Bottom half

References

External links
Main draw
Qualifying draw

Antalya Challenger IV - 1